Thomas Carlyle O'Hagan (14 April 1903 - 18 July 1958) served as a judge from 16 October 1952 until 18 July 1958 on the Supreme Court of Queensland, which is the highest ranking court in the Australian State of Queensland.

O'Hagan died in office in 1958 and is buried in Toowong Cemetery.

See also
 Judiciary of Australia
 List of Judges of the Supreme Court of Queensland

References 

http://www.sclqld.org.au/judicial-papers/judicial-profiles/profiles/tcohagan

Judges of the Supreme Court of Queensland
1958 deaths
1903 births